Blue Cloud Ventures is a Miami-based venture capital fund specializing in software-as-a-service, infrastructure, and open source software companies. The fund focuses primarily on growth stage companies with annual revenue between $10 and $50 million that are expected to reach an exit within three years. Blue Cloud is noted for offering a relatively high degree of flexibility with regards to financing terms, including the exit timeline, board representation, and the amount of funding.

Founding and Partnering

Blue Cloud was founded by Rami Rahal and Mir Arif in 2012. Both were working at Madison Park Group, a New York investment bank, which Arif was leading when Rahal, then 25 years old, proposed the idea to him.  MassMutual is a contributor to at least two of Blue Cloud's funds.

Investments

As of 2018, Blue Cloud had invested in at least 24 companies. These investments include AFS Technologies, BeyondTrust, later acquired by Veritas Capital, BTI Systems, CareCloud, Cityworks,  Clari, an AI based sales service provider,  CloudBees, Conductor, an SEO tool developer which was later acquired by WeWork,  Druva, Doctor on Demand, Evident ID, Iterable, Jazz.co (formerly Resumator)  Hireology, Lattice Engines, Lightbend, NGINX, which was later acquired by F5 Networks, OneLogin, Reval, Scribble Live, Tapad, Vidyo, and Wrike.

See also
Private equity
Venture capital

References

External links
 Blue Cloud Ventures website

Financial services companies established in 2012
Venture capital firms of the United States
Companies based in New York City